1948 in philosophy

Events 
 January 28 - The Copleston–Russell debate, a debate between Bertrand Russell and Frederick Copleston on the existence of God is broadcast by the BBC in the United Kingdom.
 December 26 - The first series of Reith Lectures, Bertrand Russell on Authority and the Individual, begins broadcasting by the BBC.

Publications 
 Erich Rothacker, Probleme der Kulturanthropologie (in German, not yet translated into English, 1948)
 Arnold J. Toynbee, Civilization on Trial (1948)
 Norbert Wiener, Cybernetics: Or Control and Communication in the Animal and the Machine (1948)

Births 
 February 12 - Ray Kurzweil 
 November 5 - Bernard-Henri Lévy 
 November 30 - Hans Moravec

Deaths 
 January 30 - Mohandas Karamchand Gandhi (born 1869) 
 April 21 - Aldo Leopold (born 1887)

References 

Philosophy
20th-century philosophy
Philosophy by year